The degree symbol or degree sign, is a typographical symbol that is used, among other things, to represent degrees of arc (e.g. in geographic coordinate systems), hours (in the medical field), degrees of temperature or alcohol proof. The symbol consists of a small superscript circle.

History
The word degree is equivalent to Latin gradus which, since the medieval period, could refer to any stage in a graded system of ranks or steps. The number of the rank in question was indicated by ordinal numbers, in abbreviation with the ordinal indicator (a superscript o).

Use of "degree" specifically for the degrees of arc, used in conjunction with Arabic numerals, became common in the 16th century, but this was without the use of an ordinal marker or degree symbol.
Similarly, the introduction of the temperature scales with degrees in the 18th century was at first without such symbols, but with the word "gradus" spelled out. Use of the degree symbol was introduced for temperature in the later 18th century and became widespread in the early 19th century.
Antoine Lavoisier in his "Opuscles physiques et chymiques" (1774) used the ordinal indicator with Arabic numerals – for example, when he wrote in the introduction:
 (p. vi)
(... a series of experiments [...] firstly, on the existence of that same elastic fluid [...])
In the same work, when Lavoisier gives a temperature, he spells out the word "degree" explicitly, for example (p. 194):  ("a temperature of 16 to 17 degrees of the thermometer").

An early use of the degree symbol proper is that by Henry Cavendish in 1776 for degrees of the Fahrenheit scale.
The degree symbol for degrees of temperature appears to have been transferred to the use for degrees of arc early in the 19th century. An early textbook using this notation is Charles Hutton, "A Course of Mathematics" vol. 1 (1836), page 383.
An earlier convention is found in Conrad Malte-Brun, "Universal Geography" vol. 1 (1827), where degrees of arc are abbreviated with a superscript "d" (alongside a superscript "m" for minutes of arc).

Typography 
In the case of degrees of angular arc, the degree symbol follows the number without any intervening space, e.g. . The addition of minute and second of arc follows the degree units, with intervening spaces (optionally, non-breaking space) between the sexagesimal degree subdivisions but no spaces between the numbers and units, for example .

In the case of degrees of temperature, three scientific and engineering standards bodies (the International Bureau of Weights and Measures, the International Organization for Standardization and the U.S. Government Printing Office) prescribe printing temperatures with a space between the number and the degree symbol, e.g. . However, in many works with professional typesetting, including scientific works published by the University of Chicago Press or Oxford University Press, the degree symbol is printed with no spaces between the number, the symbol, and the Latin letters "C" or "F" representing Celsius or Fahrenheit, respectively, e.g. . This is also the practice of the University Corporation for Atmospheric Research, which operates the National Center for Atmospheric Research. Both ASTM International and NIST, the official US entities related to the standardization of the use of units, require a space between the numerical value and the unit designator, except when the degree symbol alone is used to denote an angular value.

Use of the degree symbol to refer to temperatures measured in kelvins (symbol: K) was abolished in 1967 by the 13th General Conference on Weights and Measures (CGPM). Therefore, the triple point of water, for instance, is written simply as 273.16 K. The name of the SI unit of temperature is now "kelvin", in lower case, and no longer "degrees Kelvin".

In photography, the symbol is used to denote logarithmic film speed grades. In this usage, it follows the number without spacing as in 21° DIN, 5° ASA or ISO 100/21°.

Encoding

The degree sign was missing from the basic 7-bit ASCII set of 1963, but in 1987 the ISO/IEC 8859 standard introduced it at position 0xB0 (176 decimal) in all variants except Part 5 (Cyrillic), 6 (Arabic), 7 (Greek) and 11 (Thai). In 1991 the Unicode standard incorporated all of the ISO/IEC 8859 code points, including the degree sign (at U+00B0)..

The Windows Code Page 1252 was also an extension of ISO/IEC 8859-1 (Part 1 or Latin-1) standard, so it had the degree sign at the same code point, 0xB0.

Lookalikes 
Other characters with similar appearance but different meanings include:
  (indicator used in Italian, Spanish and Portuguese that follows a numeral denoting that it is an ordinal number, rather than a cardinal number;  varies with the font and sometimes underlined)
  (superscript letter o)
  (standalone)
  (applied to a letter)
  (applied to a letter)
  (applied to a letter)
  (standalone)
  (applied to a letter)
 (precomposed characters containing this mark also exists)
  (stand alone, typically representing either  or )
 (precomposed characters containing this mark also exists)
 
 
 
  (used in superscripted form, ⦵, to mean standard state (chemistry))

Keyboard entry
Some computer keyboard layouts, such as the QWERTY layout as used in Italy, the QWERTZ layout as used in Germany, Austria and Switzerland, and the AZERTY layout as used in France and Belgium, have the degree symbol available directly on a key. But the common keyboard layouts in English-speaking countries do not include the degree sign, which then has to be input some other way. The method of inputting depends on the operating system being used.

On Linux, one can press + twice to insert a degree sign.

Desktop Operating Systems
With Microsoft Windows, there are several ways to make the degree symbol:
 One can type  or Note: "0176" is different from "176";  produces the light shade (░) character.Note: The NumLock must be set first; on full size keyboards, the numeric keypad must be used; on laptops without a numerical keypad, the virtual numeric keypad must be used (often requiring that the  key be held down as the numeric sequence is typed).
 The Character Map tool also may be used to obtain a graphical menu of symbols.
 The US-International English keyboard layout creates the degree symbol with 

In the classic Mac OS and macOS operating systems, the degree symbol can be entered by typing .  One can also use the Mac OS character palette, which is available in many programs by selecting Special Characters from the Edit Menu, or from the 'Input Menu' (flag) icon on the menu bar (enabled in the International section of the System Preferences).

Some keyboard layouts display this symbol upon pressing  (once or twice, depending on specific keyboard layout), and, in programs created by GTK+, one can enter Unicode characters in any text entry field by first pressing , regardless of keyboard layout. For the degree symbol, this is done by entering   (where the last key is the number zero) followed by a space.

For ChromeOS, use the Unicode entry method  then  then space or return; with the UK extended layout, use .

Mobile Operating Systems
In iOS, the degree symbol is accessed by pressing and holding  and dragging a finger to the degree symbol. This procedure is the same as entering diacritics on other characters.

In Android, switch to numbers  then symbols . The degrees symbol is found on the second row.

Software-specific
In Microsoft Office and similar programs, there is often also an Insert menu with an Insert Symbol or Symbol command that brings up a graphical palette of symbols to insert, including the degree symbol. As with the CharMap app, the table is arranged in Unicode order. Alternatively, the alt code technique may be used, as described above.

In LaTeX, the packages gensymb and textcomp provide the commands  and \textdegree, respectively. In the absence of these packages one can write the degree symbol as ^{\circ} in math mode.  In other words, it is written as the empty circle glyph  as a superscript.

In AutoCAD it is available as a shortcut string .

See also
List of typographical symbols and punctuation marks
 Prime (symbol)
 Question mark
 Unicode Geometric Shapes

References

External links
 Earliest Uses of Symbols from Geometry

 

Mathematical symbols